Leon Armenovich Takhtajan (born 1 October 1950, Yerevan) is a Russian (and formerly Soviet) mathematical physicist of Armenian descent, currently a professor of mathematics at the Stony Brook University, Stony Brook, NY, and a leading researcher at the Euler International Mathematical Institute, Saint Petersburg, Russia.

Takhtajan, son of the Armenian Soviet botanist Armen Takhtajan, received in 1975 his Ph.D. (Russian candidate degree) from the Steklov Institute (Leningrad Department) under Ludvig Faddeev with thesis Complete Integrability of the Equation . He was then employed at the Steklov Institute (Leningrad Department) and in 1982 received his D.S. degree (doctor of science, 2nd degree in Russia) with thesis Completely integrable models of field theory and statistical mechanics. Since 1992 he has been a professor at Stony Brook University where he was the chair of the mathematics department in 2009–2013.

His research is on integrable systems of mathematical physics (such as the theory of solitons) and applications of quantum field theories and models of string theory to algebraic geometry and complex analysis and includes quantum field theories on algebraic curves and associated reciprocity laws, two-dimensional quantum gravity and Weil–Petersson geometry of moduli spaces, the Kähler geometry of universal Teichmüller space, and trace formulas. His major contributions are in theory of classical and quantum integrable systems, quantum groups and Weil–Petersson geometry of moduli spaces. Together with Ludvig Faddeev and Evgeny Sklyanin he formulated the algebraic Bethe Ansatz and quantum inverse scattering method. Together with Ludvig Faddeev and Nicolai Reshetikhin he proposed a method of quantization of Lie groups and algebras, the FRT construction. In 1983 he was an invited speaker at the International Congress of Mathematicians in Warsaw and gave a talk Integrable models in classical and quantum field theory.

Selected publications

Articles
 
 
 Решетихин Н. Ю., Тахтаджян Л. А., Фаддеев Л. Д. Квантование групп Ли и алгебр Ли — Алгебра и анализ, 1:1 (1989), Eng. translation:
  1988 reprint as book chapter in Algebraic Analysis: Papers Dedicated to Professor Mikioi Sato on the Occasion of His Sixtieth Birthday

Books

References

External links
mathnet.ru

1950 births
Mathematical physicists
Russian mathematicians
20th-century American mathematicians
21st-century American mathematicians
Living people
American people of Armenian descent
Stony Brook University faculty